Delilah Asiago (born 24 February 1972) is a retired female athlete from Kenya. She specialized in long-distance running, including marathons.

She was banned for two years after she tested positive for doping during the 1999 Saint Silvester Race. Nevertheless, she was still active in 2006 when she won the Dubai Marathon.

Asiago holds 4-Mile and 12-Kilometer road running world records. She was awarded the  "Road Racer of the Year" prize in 1995 by Running Times.

International competitions

Road races
1995 - Falmouth Road Race, 1st
1995 - Steamboat Classic, 1st (time 19:28, a 4-Mile world record)
1995 - Bay to Breakers, 1st,  (time 38:23, a 12-km world record)
2002 - Great Lake Marathon, 1st 
2003 - Nairobi Marathon, 2nd
2004 - Rotterdam Marathon, 6th (time 2:37:24, her personal record)
2005 - Nairobi Marathon, 6th
2006 - Dubai Marathon, 1st
2006 - Salt Lake City Marathon, 3rd

See also
List of doping cases in athletics

References

External links 

Marathoninfo profile



1972 births
Living people
Kenyan female long-distance runners
Kenyan female marathon runners
African Games silver medalists for Kenya
African Games bronze medalists for Kenya
African Games medalists in athletics (track and field)
Athletes (track and field) at the 1991 All-Africa Games
Athletes (track and field) at the 1995 All-Africa Games
World Athletics Championships athletes for Japan
Japan Championships in Athletics winners
Doping cases in athletics
Kenyan sportspeople in doping cases